James Coulter was an American college football coach. He served as the head coach at the University of Georgia team during the 1909 season. A graduate of Brown University, Coulter had no head coaching experience before leading the Georgia team. He hired an experienced assistant coach from Georgia Tech, Frank Dobson, who overshadowed Coulter, so that the two were considered co-head coaches. During his single season, Coulter's team compiled a record of 2–4–2.

Head coaching record

References

Year of birth missing
Year of death missing
Brown University alumni
Georgia Bulldogs football coaches